"Not Tomorrow Yet" is the twelfth episode of the sixth season of the post-apocalyptic horror television series The Walking Dead, which aired on AMC on March 6, 2016. The episode was written by Seth Hoffman and directed by Greg Nicotero.

Plot
While foraging in the woods, Carol kills a walker then painstakingly recomposes her appearance before making and distributing acorn and beet cookies to the children and her friends in Alexandria. She is shaken when Rick returns saying they will have to fight, and visits Sam Anderson's grave. Morgan finds her there and asks why they haven't talked since they fought in the basement several weeks ago. It turns out that Carol convinced Denise, Eugene, Tara and Rosita to keep quiet about the incident, on the pretense of protecting Denise, though Carol seems less certain now about who it is that she's protecting. Carol leaves a cookie on Sam's grave, troubled over who is going to die next.

Rick calls a meeting and lays out the deal with the Hilltop and explains how the Saviors nearly killed Sasha, Abraham, and Daryl, and it would only be a matter of time before they found Alexandria. Morgan proposes that stating their willingness to fight might be enough to stop the Saviors, but Rick disagrees and won't give up the initiative, preferring to make a pre-emptive sneak attack against the Saviors and kill them all.

Sleepless that night, Carol opens a diary which seems to be a list of the people she has killed: Ryan Samuels; Karen; David; Lizzie; approximately seven at Terminus; and seven Wolves. She totals it to 18 lives taken, circling the number as it weighs on her conscience. Carol walks aimlessly, smoking again, and finds Tobin also restless. Tobin admits that Carol can do things that terrify him, and says that she's still a mom, that she has that strength toward most of the people in Alexandria, but she means something else to him. She kisses him.

Maggie and Glenn are worried, too. As negotiator for the deal Maggie feels she has a moral imperative to see it through, though she suggests she takes a perimeter position keeping watch.

Abraham takes the opportunity of the trip to pack up and move out, leaving Rosita, saying that "it happens." She demands answers and Abraham admits that when they met he thought she was the last woman on earth — but she isn't. As Abraham walks out, Eugene is unable to console Rosita. Later, still fuming about the breakup, Rosita complains to Carol about Morgan having the nerve to make waves at the meeting, but she agrees with Carol not to tell.

Rick, Glenn, Maggie, and Daryl strategize with Andy, a Hilltop scout, on attacking the building they believe to be the Saviors' stronghold. They plan to arrive at night, on the ruse that they are delivering Gregory's head to gain admittance to the building, and seize the room they believe to be the armory. To facilitate this, Glenn and Heath kill some walkers, looking for a stand-in for Gregory's head, and talk about having to kill another person for the first time. Rick, Jesus, and Andy pick from among three heads, and after Rick breaks the nose of one Andy says that the Saviors are scary but they've got nothing on Rick.

They arrive at a facility with two enormous radio dishes. Andy plays his role cowing to the two Savior sentries as he brings the head, and succeeds in fooling them. One of them is killed by Daryl and when the second returns with hostage Craig, Michonne kills him before he notices anything amiss. Operating in pairs, Rick and Daryl, Abraham and Sasha, Glenn and Heath, and Rosita and Aaron infiltrate the building with Michonne in reserve. They begin a systematic room-by-room search for the armory, murdering any sleeping men as they are encountered. After committing his first human kill with Heath, Glenn finds a wall decorated with 20 polaroids of headshot wounds, reminiscent of a serial killer's trophies.

Outside, Tara and Gabriel help Andy take Craig away to a vehicle where they keep watch with Jesus. Tara asks Gabriel if he's still a priest, and confesses that she lied to Denise, that she'd been involved in an attack on another human community before, and didn't like it. Gabriel and Jesus comfort her by saying that her love for Denise is her reason to fight.

While Sasha and Abraham are occupied by a locked door, a Savior walks in on them and slices Abraham with a knife. Sasha stabs him but the man defiantly pulls a fire alarm. Carol and Maggie, keeping watch opposite Tara and Gabriel, hear the alarm but Carol, who was angry about Maggie being on the raid and insisted on accompanying her, blocks Maggie and tells her to stay out of the fight. Tara and Jesus send Andy to return Craig to the Hilltop to keep their deal alive and make sure the Hilltop isn't blamed for the attack. Jesus, however, dons his mask and goes in, claiming the Saviors won't see him.

Rick uses suppressive fire from an assault rifle to kill three Saviors descending a stairway. Aaron kills another and is then saved by Rosita. Tara and Gabriel gun-down Saviors who attempt to flee the building. The action reaches a climax as the attackers try to find the Savior's armory. Abraham busts down a locked door and discovers a small marijuana grow-room. Aaron forces another door open and finds a supply closet. Glenn and Heath find the armory and pick up assault rifles to shoot full-auto through its door at their pursuers; they are shocked at the carnage they have caused and a wounded Savior points a handgun at Glenn but is killed by the timely arrival of Jesus. In the end, Rick's side suffer no casualties.

When there is full daylight, Tara and Heath depart on a planned scavenger run. Morgan, back at Alexandria, busily welds bars together to make a detention cell. While Michonne wonders which of the corpses might be Negan, Rick's group stop a last Savior attempting to escape by motorcycle — Daryl's which had been stolen earlier. Daryl is beating the man when a female voice comes over the Savior's walkie-talkie ordering them to lower their weapons, saying that they have Carol and Maggie.

Production
This is Alanna Masterson's final appearance in the season due to her maternity leave. She makes a brief reappearance in a dream sequence in the seventh season premiere and returns full time in the sixth episode of the seventh season, "Swear".

One of the severed zombie heads featured in the episode was based on Johnny Depp. Episode director Greg Nicotero said, "I think we had sculpted an emaciated version of a dummy head for something and we used Johnny Depp's head as a basis just for a clay sculpt." This episode features the first appearance of Alicia Witt, who has a voice-only role at the end of the episode. Her casting was announced in February 2016.

Reception

Critical reception
The episode received critical acclaim. It holds a 96% positive rating with an average score of 8.34 out of 10 on the review aggregator Rotten Tomatoes. The critics' consensus reads: "Not Tomorrow Yet" tests viewers' patience with slow-building tension—and delivers with a powerful, action-packed ending.

Ratings
The episode averaged a 6.1 rating in adults 18-49, with 12.816 million viewers overall. With Live+7 DVR viewing included, the episode had an overall rating of 18.6 million viewers and a 9.3 in the 18-49 demographic.

References

External links

"Not Tomorrow Yet" at AMC

2016 American television episodes
The Walking Dead (season 6) episodes